Todd A. Rock (born 1963) is a Republican member of the Pennsylvania House of Representatives for the 90th legislative district and was elected in 2006.

Rock, a teacher at the Franklin County Career and Technology Center, entered the race for state representative having been motivated by the 2005 legislative pay raise.  In the Republican primary election, Rock defeated 18-term incumbent Patrick Fleagle by 111 votes.  Fleagle was able to get on the ballot by defeating Rock 339-336 as a write-in for the Democratic ballot, setting up a rematch of the two rivals in the fall.  In the general election, Rock defeated Fleagle with 54% of the vote.

References

External links
Pennsylvania House of Representatives - Todd Rock official PA House website
Pennsylvania House Republican Caucus - Representative Todd Rock official Party website

Living people
Republican Party members of the Pennsylvania House of Representatives
People from Franklin County, Pennsylvania
1963 births
21st-century American politicians